Larry Wanke is a former American football quarterback and in the 1991 NFL Draft, was Mr. Irrelevant.

High school career
Wanke attended Benedictine High School in Cleveland, Ohio.

College career
Wanke initially attended the University of Pittsburgh, but ultimately transferred to John Carroll University.  The transfer was due to a quarterback competition at Pittsburgh and health problems of his father.

Professional career

New York Giants
Wanke was drafted by the New York Giants in the 1991 NFL Draft, which earned him the title of Mr. Irrelevant. Wanke, however, never made an NFL roster.

References

Living people
American football quarterbacks
John Carroll Blue Streaks football players
Year of birth missing (living people)